Ahmad H.M. Ali, BEc (born 16 May 1969) is an Indonesian politician who served as a member of the People's Representative Council for two terms (2014–2019 and 2019–2024).) He represents the electoral district of Central Sulawesi. Ali is a cadre of the NasDem Party. Currently, he sits in Third Commission and doubles as the Chairman of the NasDem Party Faction in the DPR-RI.

Educational Background  

 Wosu primary school (1975–1981)
 Bungku Junior High School (1982–1985)
 Bungku High School (1985–1988)
 Bachelor of Economics, Tadulako University (1988–1993)

Organizational History  

 Chairman of the Asphalt Association
 Chairman of Provincial Grapensi
 Chairman of DPW NasDem Party of Central Sulawesi
 Management of KADIN Central Sulawesi
 Pancasila Youth Board
 Executive Board of HMI Palu Branch
 General Treasurer of the DPP NasDem Party (2017–2019)
 Vice Chairman of the DPP NasDem Party (2019–2024)

Career  

 Employee at PT Tadulako Dirgantara Travel
 Director of PT Graha Istika Utama
 Director of PT Graha Agro Utama
 Director of PT Graha Mining Utama
 Member of the Regional House of Representatives of Morowali Regency (2009–2014)
 Member of DPR-RI (2014–2019, 2019–present)
 Chairman of the NasDem Party Faction of the House of Representatives (2019–present)

Reference 

Members of the People's Representative Council, 2019
Members of the People's Representative Council, 2014
Nasdem Party politicians
Indonesian politicians
People from Central Sulawesi
Date of birth missing